The Vale of Clwyd Railway (VoCR) was a standard-gauge line which connected the towns of Rhyl and Denbigh via St Asaph in North Wales.

It opened in 1858, at first without a connection to the main line at Rhyl, but this was provided in 1862. At Denbigh the line later connected to other lines. Although the area became popular with holidaymakers in the 1920s and later, the line never realised its potential, and it closed to passengers in 1955, and completely in 1968.

Conception
The Chester and Holyhead Railway completed its main line in 1850. There was a considerable area of agricultural land south of the line, towards Denbigh, and a number of schemes were put forward to serve the area. The C&HR found itself short of funds to complete its main line, so it was left to independent promoters to put a scheme forward.

This proved to be the Vale of Clwyd Railway, which was authorised by Parliament on 23 June 1856. Contracts for construction were awarded to David Davies and Thomas Savin.

Opening

Construction was fairly rapid, and the line opened on 5 October 1858, for passengers and goods. There were four trains each way every weekday. The Denbigh station was a temporary structure, and the permanent building opened in December 1860.

Stations were at Foryd, Rhuddlan, St Asaph, Trefnant and Denbigh. A VoCR director, Whitehall Dod, had the right to stop trains adjacent to his estate at Llannerch, a mile north of Trefnant, until December 1871 when that right expired. There was also a siding for a brickworks at the locality. The siding was extended during World War II for use in connection with an army stores depot.

Getting to Rhyl, and Foryd
In 1860 the Company sought powers to enter Rhyl station with their trains; the station was on the main line, now controlled by the London and North Western Railway. The LNWR was agreeable, but demanded reciprocal running powers to Denbigh, obviously an unequal trade. The deal did not go ahead.

Hugh Robert Hughes of Kinmel Hall owned land at Foryd beach and a pier there, from which he operated steamers. He had hoped that the Vale of Clwyd Railway would run to his pier and make connections there, but this would have involved crossing the Chester and Holyhead Railway main line, and that company objected, chiefly because they feared competing steamer traffic to Liverpool from Hughes' pier. However the VoCR had laid a temporary branch siding to the beach from their Foryd station, for the purpose of acquiring track ballast. Hughes took possession of the branch siding, saying that he would use it for ordinary railway purposes, and connecting with the VoCR at Foryd station.

The C&HR forcibly ejected Hughes' men from the branch line, but Hughes secured an injunction in his favour, and the short branch was operated as a full railway to and from the pier. The feared steamers to Liverpool operated in connection. However the steamer operator discovered that the VoCR was negotiating with the LNWR to lease the line to the larger company; other internal hostilities surfaced, and the VoCR was riven with dissension.

Connecting to other lines
Denbigh was not destined to be a terminus; a south-eastward railway, the Denbigh, Ruthin and Corwen Railway was authorised on 23 July 1860; coupled with the Vale of Llangollen Railway and a Corwen extension, a viable route from Ruabon was likely to be created.

At this time there was every likelihood of the Great Western Railway reaching Rhyl, an important regional centre, via the lines from Ruabon via Llangollen and Corwen. For some time this seemed inevitable, but in time the GWR lost interest and the scheme was not pursued.

On 30 June 1862 the extension sought by the pier owner Hughes was passed in Parliament; now the VoCR could legally reach the beach and a new pier, and a proper junction with the C&HR line (now under LNWR control) could be made. Goods traffic started in the latter half of 1864, and (after some difficulty) the extension was passed for passenger operation, but this was never acted on.

Train services
In December 1862 the Oswestry newspaper reported that additional passenger services would be provided by attaching passenger coaches to goods trains:

much increased accommodation, making… six trains daily between Rhyl and Denbigh and five between Ruthin and Rhyl... the Company do not of course guarantee exact time with the goods trains, having made these arrangements at the request of several inhabitants... in the Vale.

In 1864 the LNWR was formally authorised to work the VoCR line (as they had been doing informally) and the company was absorbed by the LNWR by Act of 15 July 1867.

1895 passenger train service
Bradshaw's Guide for 1895 showed the train service: there were six trains each way between Denbigh and Rhyl, calling at all stations. Most of the trains made reasonable connections at Denbigh.

After 1923
At the beginning of 1923, the railways of Great Britain were grouped into one or other of four new large companies, under the Railways Act 1921. The LNWR was a constituent of the new London Midland and Scottish Railway. Seaside holidays were increasingly popular, and the North Wales coast was an attractive destination. The passenger trains service was augmented accordingly, and seventeen trains ran each way daily in the summer in the 1930s.

Nevertheless the line remained a rural outpost, and use of the line declined: it was closed to passengers on 19 September 1955 and completely from 1965.

Today, the tracked remains intact as far as St Asaph before the line is severed by the North Wales Expressway. From Rhuddlan to Denbigh, the line has been built on.

Station list

 Foryd Pier; opened August 1859; relocated nearer river mouth 1866; closed 1885;
 Foryd; opened 5 October 1858; replaced by new station opened 20 April 1885 on main line; closed 2 July 1917; reopened 1 July 1919; closed 5 January 1931;
 Rhuddlan; opened 5 October 1858; closed 19 September 1955;
 St Asaph; opened 5 October 1858; closed 19 September 1955;
 Llannerch; opened 5 October 1858; closed December 1871; private stopping place;
 Trefnant; opened 5 October 1858; closed 19 September 1955;
 Mold and Denbigh Junction; convergence of line from Mold;
 Denbigh; opened 5 October 1858; original temporary station was replaced December 1860; closed 30 April 1962.

Notes

References

Closed railway lines in Wales
Standard gauge railways in Wales